("Double-A Baseball"), governed by the  (Puerto Rico Amateur Baseball Federation), is a Puerto Rican amateur baseball spring and summer baseball league, founded in 1940 and based in San Juan. The season normally starts in mid to late February and ends with the Carnaval de Campeones (Carnival of Champions) final in September. They play a weekend schedule (Friday, Saturday and Sunday), and their all-star game is held soon after the regular season and before the playoffs. The Toritos de Cayey are the defending champions.

League structure
For the upcoming 2023 season, the League will have two new franchises: Criollos de Caguas and Cachorros de Ponce. This brings the total number of teams to 45. There will continue to be 8 divisions, 3 with 5 teams and 5 with 6 teams. Caguas will be part of the Central Section and Ponce will be part of the Southern Section.  Previously, in 2021, the Gigantes de Carolina were admitted to the league.

2023 teams

North Division 

Industriales de Barceloneta
Areneros de Camuy
Titanes de Florida
Tigres de Hatillo
Atenienses de Manatí
Montañeses de Utuado

Northwest Division 

Navegantes de Aguada
Tiburones de Aguadilla
Fundadores de Añasco
Libertadores de Hormigueros
Patrulleros de San Sebastian

Southwest Division 

Piratas de Cabo Rojo
Cardenales de Lajas
Petroleros de Peñuelas
Petateros de Sabana Grande
Cafeteros de Yauco

South Division 

Maratonistas de Coamo
Brujos de Guayama
Poetas de Juana Diaz
Cachorros de Ponce **
Peces Voladores de Salinas
Potros de Santa Isabel

Metropolitan Division 

Gigantes de Carolina
Lancheros de Cataño
Guardianes de Dorado
Mets de Guaynabo
Maceteros de Vega Alta
Caimanes de Vega Baja

East Division 

Cariduros de Fajardo
Halcones de Gurabo
Mulos de Juncos
Artesanos de Las Piedras
Cocoteros de Loiza
Guerrilleros de Rio Grande

Southeast Division 

Grises de Humacao
Jueyeros de Maunabo
Leones de Patillas
Samaritanos de San Lorenzo
Azucareros de Yabucoa

Central Division 

Polluelos de Aibonito
Proceres de Barranquitas
Bravos de Cidra
Criollos de Caguas **
Toritos de Cayey
Pescadores del Plata de Comerio

Regular Season Format

For the 2023 season, each of the 45 teams will play 16 regular season games, for a total of 720 scheduled games. During the regular phase, in extra-innings, the international rule of runners on first and second base for the team on offense will apply.

Playoffs

Divisional Semifinals and Finals

The first four teams in each division (32 teams) will advance to the first stage of the postseason.  It will be played as follows: Section Semifinal (best of 5 games), Section Final (best of 7 games). The champion of each division (8 teams) will advance to the Carnival of Champions.

Carnival of Champions

To the second stage of the post-season, the 8 divisional champions advance to the Carnival of Champions. Each team will play 7 games, one with each other in a round robin series. The first 4 places advance to the National Semifinal (best of 7 games) and the two winners advance to the National Final (best of 7 games) to decide the National Champion for the 2023 Season.

Championships by franchise (all-time)
In 2019,  won their tenth championship.

References

External links
 The official website of the Federación de Béisbol de Puerto Rico
 Cidra Braves (Bravos de Cidra)
 Camuy Arenas
 Tigres de Hatillo
 Cariduros de Fajardo
 Mets de Guaynabo
 Navegantes de Aguada
 Patrulleros de San Sebastian

Baseball leagues in Puerto Rico
1940 establishments in Puerto Rico
Sports leagues established in 1940
Summer baseball leagues
Minor league baseball leagues
Sports governing bodies in Puerto Rico
Organizations based in San Juan, Puerto Rico